John Willis may refer to:

John Willis (basketball) (born 1952), American-Israeli  basketball player
John Willis (inventor) (c. 1575–1625), British clergyman, stenographer and mnemonician
John Willis (gangster), American mobster linked with the Chinese Mafia
John A. Willis (1916–2010), American theatre and film book editor, theatre awards producer, actor, and educator
John Christopher Willis (1868–1958), English botanist
John Willis (RAF officer) (1937–2008), Royal Air Force officer
John Harlan Willis (1921–1945), U.S. Navy hospital corpsman
John Willis (bishop) (1872–1954), Anglican bishop
John Walpole Willis (1793–1877), Welsh-born judge in the Supreme Court of New South Wales
John Willis (cricketer) (1886–1963), English cricketer
John Willis (musician), American guitarist and songwriter
John T. Willis (born 1933), Old Testament scholar
John 'Jock' Willis (1791–1862), ship captain and founder of the Jock Willis Shipping Line, also known as John Willis & Sons
John 'Jock' Willis (1817–1899), his son, owner of the Cutty Sark

People with similar names
John Willis Clark (1833–1910), English academic and antiquarian
John Willis Fleming (1781–1844), English landed proprietor and member of parliament
John Willis Menard (1838–1893), American federal government employee, poet, newspaper publisher and politician

See also
USS John Willis (DE-1027), a Dealey-class destroyer escort in the United States Navy
Jonathan S. Willis (1830–1903), American minister, farmer and politician
Jon Willis (born 1981), British fencer